Lost Days is the second album by Ringside. It  was released on January 25, 2011 (see 2011 in music.)

Track listing
"Starbrite"  – 3:19
"Hey"  – 3:10
"This Time"  – 4:11
"Money"  – 2:54
"Freedom"  – 3:57
"Should've Known"  – 3:31
"Satellite"  – 3:52
"Dayglo"  – 3:28
"Stay"  – 4:15
"Love in the Asylum"  – 4:06
"Feel So Alone"  – 4:11
"Lost Days" (feat. Ben Harper)  – 4:18
"Stronger" – 4:03
"Good" - 4:47
"Trouble's Gone" - 1:46

References

2011 albums
Ringside albums